The Northern Patrol, also known as Cruiser Force B and the Northern Patrol Force, was an operation of the British Royal Navy during the First World War and Second World War. The Patrol was part of the British "distant" blockade of Germany. Its main task was to prevent trade to and from Germany by checking merchant ships and their cargoes. It was also to stop German warships, raiders and other German naval ships from leaving the North Sea for the Atlantic Ocean or entering the North Sea from the Atlantic, protect Shetland against invasion and to gather intelligence from intercepted neutral ships.

The Northern Patrol operated under the command of the Grand Fleet during the First World War. At first, Edgar-class cruisers were used but these were not built for the seas around Scotland in winter and were replaced by civilian ships pressed into service as Armed Merchant Cruisers.

In the Second World War the Northern Patrol was commanded by the Home Fleet in the. Perhaps the Northern Patrol's most famous action was the loss of the armed merchant cruiser  On 23 November 1939. Captain Edward Kennedy RN, commander of the ANC  decided to fight the 11-inch gun German capital ships Scharnhorst and Gneisenau, rather than surrender as demanded. The crew of Rawalpindi managed to inflict splinter damage on Scharnhorst during a short engagement, before being sunk only a few survivors being rescued by the Germans.

Background

Blockade, 1815–1914

For much of the nineteenth century, the Admiralty and much of the navy took it that the main aim was to engage and defeat an opposing fleet. In 1908 war orders to the Channel Fleet were that

Success in this object would guarantee command of the English Channel and the North Sea, secure British trade and territory and allow the Expeditionary Force to reach France. The Admiralty expected that the German fleet would sally forth, soon after the declaration of war to contest British command of the sea. An alternative to decisive battle was the close blockade of opposing ports as occurred during the Napoleonic Wars (1803–1815). Swift-sailing frigates cruised off French ports, backed by bigger ships out to sea. The blockading ships were almost immune to attack and with no need to return to port to refuel. The advent of steam power required more frequent returns to port for coal and after 1900, the risks to blockading ships multiplied with the advent of mines, torpedoes, submarines and long-range coastal artillery. By 1912, Airships and aircraft could uncover the position of the bigger ships off shore and direct submarines and destroyers towards them. During the Russo-Japanese War (1904–1905), the Japanese fleet conducting the last close blockade, of Port Arthur, had suffered many losses from mines.

The Navy policy for blockade evolved, in 1908 the commander of the Channel Fleet ordered that the big ships would move to positions beyond the range at which German destroyers could not reach if sailing at nightfall with orders to return the next morning, reckoned to be . British ships in the Heligoland Bight should try to cut off German ships sailing from the Elbe or Jade or report the sailing of the High Seas Fleet. The Admiralty had a change of heart in 1911 but by 1912 th war orders stipulated that a close blockade was superseded by an observational blockade formed by cruisers and destroyers ranged from the Norwegian south-west coast, to half-way between Germany and England, level with Newcastle, then south to Texel with the Battle Fleet cruising to the west of the line.

Plans from 1905 to capture a German North Sea island as a forward base were also abandoned after the Germans fortified Heligoland and the Frisian Islands and the Grand Fleet war plans of June 1914 scrapped the observational blockade for the Grand Fleet to be based in Scotland except for the Channel Fleet which would remain on the south coast. The bases of the Grand Fleet were to block the northern exists of the North Sea and the Channel Fleet to seal the channel. The northerly line would stretch from the Scottish coast and northern islands to Norway, with the Grand Fleet based at Scapa Flow in Orkney with un-armoured cruisers (later named the Northern Patrol) patrolling a line from the Shetlands to the Norwegian coast. The German navy was ignorant of the new policy and expected to find plenty of opportunities to whittle away the numerical superiority of the British.

North Sea exits

In a naval war with Germany, Britain had the great geographical advantage of obstructing German access to the Atlantic Ocean. Using the northabout route past Scotland would consume a vast amount of coal and ships would have to make passage through another restricted and stormy sea of about  width between the Orkney Islands and Shetland Islands off the north of Scotland and the Norwegian coast.

A German ship that got as far as Cape Clear Island, at the extreme south-west of Ireland, would have to commandeer coal from captured ships, a risky and unreliable method of re-fuelling. The British could exploit the same geographical and oceanic conditions to intercept German sea traffic and attempts of the Imperial German Navy to operate outside the North Sea. With the Grand Fleet based at Scapa Flow in the Orkneys, the northabout route would be blocked, with the assistance of a cruiser squadron keeping watch on the seas to the east and north of Shetland; other cruiser squadrons would watch a second line to the north.

British naval preparations
In 1914, the British government expected that economic pressure would have a great effect on Germany. The Admiralty war plan anticipated that Germany would be the main enemy in a European war and that a distant naval blockade would cut trade to and from Germany, including goods carried in neutral vessels. A special naval force was to patrol the sea routes between the north of Scotland and Norway and intercept traffic from the Atlantic into the North Sea. The Northern Patrol was to be provided by Cruiser Force B (later the 10th Cruiser Squadron) from Scapa Flow in Orkney. The cruiser squadrons of the Grand Fleet based at Cromarty and Rosyth were to form a cordon further to the south as another blockade line. The administrative complications of the blockade overwhelmed the capacity of Vice Admiral Francis Miller, the Base Admiral in Chief from 7 August 1914, devolving on the commander in chief, Admiral John Jellicoe. To relieve the administrative burdens on Miller and Jellicoe, the post of the Admiral Commanding, Orkneys and Shetlands was created to oversee the defence of the islands, naval bases and shore duties. Vice-Admiral Stanley Colville was appointed to the command (7 September 1914 – 19 January 1916) with Miller subordinate to him.

First World War

Cruiser Force B

The Canadian naval officer, Dudley de Chair, had a steady rise through the naval hierarchy and reached the rank of rear-admiral in 1912. Early in 1913 he became naval secretary to Winston Churchill, the First Lord of the Admiralty (1911–1915). After several full and frank exchanges of views with Churchill, de Chair was denied the command of the 2nd Cruiser Squadron that had been promised as his next appointment. De Chair received instead the post of Admiral of the Training Service, something of a snub, which included eight ageing Edgar-class cruisers built from 1889 to 1894. Under a 1913 war plan, the 10th Cruiser Squadron (10th CS) and 11th Cruiser Squadrons were to close the northabout route past the British Isles between Orkney, Shetland, Iceland and Norway but in 1914, the 11th Cruiser Squadron, as Cruiser Force E, was sent to the Persian Gulf, leaving the 10th Cruiser Squadron to make do.

Mobilisation orders were issued by the Admiralty on 19 July 1914 and on 3 August, de Chair was ordered to take the Edgars to Scapa Flow in the Orkneys. The cruisers were ordered from their ports and en route the 10th CS captured SS William Behrens a German ship carrying timber which was sent to port under a prize crew.  and  made a delayed arrival on 6 August having chased , a German liner carrying precious metals, sending it into Falmouth. On 7 August Edgar sank two German trawlers which had tried to run instead of stopping when ordered. The seas between Scotland and Norway were notoriously dangerous; in the summer, mist and sudden high winds were common, for the rest of the year there were gales, stormy seas and long nights, with short, dull days under leaden skies. It was common for winds to reach force 9 or 10 on the Beaufort scale, raising seas higher than ships' masts. A local phenomenon, lumps, were waves which had superimposed and which, in a force 10 gale, arrived without warning, damaging ships and occasionally sinking them.

The 10th CS reached full strength on 7 August and commenced operations to,

The Edgars were first-class protected cruisers, old, Victorian ships. The ships carried two 9.2-inch (234 mm) guns and ten 6-inch (150 mm) quick-firers for the ships to fire broadside into opposing ships. The Edgars had been built to patrol the seas, protecting trade and overawing recalcitrant colonials. By 1914 they were in no condition to spend long periods in such dangerous seas; many of the crews were recalled pensioners, somewhat surprised to return to service. De Chair established a base at Swarbacks Minn, an anchorage on the west side of Shetland. On 10 August, de Chair formed the First Division with Crescent, Grafton, Endymion and Theseus; Edgar, Royal Arthur, Gibraltar and Hawke became the Second Division. The   Shetland–Faroe gap was watched by the First Division and the Second Division was sent to watch the Orkney–Norway gap. The Edgars were slow in speed and acceleration and had to make frequent returns to port for coaling, reducing each patrol to three ships. During autumn, the weather deteriorated and sometimes was so bad as to preclude boarding ships. The mechanical state of the ships declined,  and  soon needing repairs.

During October, de Chair was ordered to patrol further to the south during a big operation to protect a convoy of 33 cruise liners transporting the Canadian Expeditionary Force to Britain. At  Hawke was struck by a torpedo from U-9, capsized and sank. None of the other ships saw the sinking and found out only after U-9 attacked and missed Theseus. The patrol was ordered to head north-west at high speed but Hawke failed to acknowledge the signal. , an extremely fast destroyer, was sent from Scapa Flow to investigate and found a raft with 22 survivors. A Norwegian merchant ship rescued 49 men from a boat and transferred them to a British trawler but 524 members of the crew perished. Before sailing, the captain, Hugh Williams, had visited Crescent and asked de Chair for another two days to make repairs to the engines. As Williams left the flagship, he was reported saying

On 21 October, Crescent was surprised to be taken under fire by a tanker, north-north-west of Foula. The tanker soon caught fire on the deck and sent up a white flag. Due to the sea state, no boarding party was risked and the ship was escorted to Lerwick, where it was found to have been bought by the  two months earlier, for service as an oceanic U-boat supply ship.

The decrepitude of the Edgars continued to interfere with operations; on 29 October  reported engine-trouble and unstable funnels. Theseus broke down chasing another ship and on 31 October reported more defects, being sent back to Swarbacks Minn to make repairs. Endymion docked at Scapa Flow and reported that it could not sail due to unserviceable engines and trouble with the fore bridge. On 11 November, Edgar had more engine trouble and had to return to Shetland when the weather had improved. Along with the frequent defects arising in the Edgars, Jellicoe ordered sweeps outside the cruisers' patrol areas reducing the Northern Patrol to nearly nothing. On 11 November, Crescent shipped a lump over the forecastle, which carried away de Chair's sea cabin, a whaler and swamped a ventilator, dousing several boilers; Edgar lost a crewmember and a cutter swept overboard. Afterwards, de Chair said that he had doubted that Crescent could survive. Crescent, Royal Arthur and Grafton were sent to the Clyde for repairs but the dockyard director stressed the diminishing returns that repairs would realise. On 20 November the Admiralty ordered the seven Edgars back to their home ports to be paid off. In under five months, the Edgars had boarded more than 300 ships and intercepted many others in storm-wracked seas.

Edgar-class cruisers

Armed merchant cruisers 
In mid-August 1914 the first AMC started operations with the Northern Patrol and soon enough AMCs were available to take over from the Edgars. The AMCs were faster, longer-ranged, had better sea-keeping and more reliable machinery than the Edgars and provided their crews with far more comfortable quarters. Later, armed trawlers were added to the force and warships from the Grand Fleet or other commands would temporarily be attached to the patrol. Admiral de Chair was replaced in March 1916 by Rear-Admiral (later vice-admiral) Reginald Tupper, who commanded the 10th Cruiser Squadron until it was disbanded on 29 November 1917. The entry of the United States, the main source of contraband, into the war drastically reduced the need for the blockade. The ships of the force were transferred to convoy and anti-submarine work. Royal Navy officers were appointed to command the AMCs and most of their masters stayed on as advisers. Many of their other mercantile officers were retained and the crews were drawn from the Royal Naval Reserve and the Mercantile Marine (many of whom had crewed the vessels in peacetime) with a "small number" from the Royal Fleet Reserve.

Before the disbandment of the 10th Cruiser Squadron on 29 November 1917, the ships of the Northern Patrol inspected almost 13,000 merchant vessels at sea and only 642 ships managed to elude the blockade. The cruiser HMS Hawke and ten AMCs (including Avenger) were lost. In 1980, A. Cecil Hampshire wrote that the blockade is generally considered to have been one of the main causes of the defeat of Germany in the First World War.

Second World War

Mobilisation

In June 1939 the Admiralty began to call up reservists, 12,000 for the Reserve Fleet, as its ships were prepared to return to service; by 9 August the ships had received their complement of crews. The ships had been designed for operations in the North Sea but had soon been sent onto far rougher waters. Six of the vessels had been used as boys' training ships. Two Emerald class light cruisers and the Hawkins-class cruiser , the flagship of the Admiral Commanding, Northern Patrol, Vic-Admiral Max Horton were added.

The Northern Patrol was re-established on 6 September 1939, three days after the start of the Second World War. Its area of operations was more extensive than during the First World War and included the areas north of Scotland and Ireland, between the north of Scotland and Norway, around Shetland, the Faeroe Islands and Iceland and the Denmark Strait between Iceland and Greenland. Armed merchant cruisers soon replaced the light and heavy cruisers. As in the First World War, warships from the Home Fleet or other commands were temporarily attached to the Northern Patrol. The force operated within the command area of the Vice-Admiral or Rear-Admiral Commanding in the Orkneys and Shetlands who administered the islands and commanded the defences of Scapa Flow but was not subordinate to him.

Cruiser squadrons 1939–1940 

The three cruiser squadrons were supplemented and then replaced by armed merchant cruisers, the survivors of which were dispersed to other duties between late 1940 and 1941.

Commanders, Northern Patrol

Second Northern Patrol
By October 1939 the Admiralty had requisitioned 51 ships for use as armed merchant cruisers. The first group of twenty AMCs were to fitted with Emergency Equipment in British ports with six more being converted overseas. The Emergency scale consisted of ancient 6-inch guns and mountings, a light director control, wooden magazines and shell-rooms and no divided storage for anti-aircraft ammunition. Only easily removed woodwork was to be removed such as furniture and bulkheads. The crew would be placed in the existing accommodation rather than broadside messes. Defensive shielding would be limited to protecting the bridge with sandbags and steel plates with more plates for the steering gear and machinery. It was hoped to have the ships operational in two and a half to three weeks. Complete Equipment was to follow, comprising full director systems, watertight magazines and shell rooms made of steel, broadside mess decks with hammocks, four paravanes per ship, the removal of more woodwork and thirteen 6-inch gun sets taken from C- and D-class cruisers once they were re-armed as anti-aircraft cruisers.

Due to equipment shortages, the ships were fitted with six to nine 6-inch guns (some with 5.5-inch), two to four 3-inch or 4-inch anti-aircraft guns, several smaller guns and roll-off racks for a small number of depth charges. The guns and mountings were old, their ammunition had to be carried by hand and at 20° elevation reached their maximum range of only , the guns had director control but very little shielding. The armament of the C- and D-class cruisers had been intended for the AMCs but the decision to keep the cruisers in service precluded this. Royal Navy captains or commanders were put in command of the vessels, mostly dug-outs from retirement, accompanied by Navy first lieutenants, navigation and gunnery officers, some of whom were also Navy personnel and the rest of the officers were drawn from the RNR, some being the civilian officers of the ships, RNVR and T.124 agreement (voluntary enlistment and subject to RN discipline whilst retaining civilian rates of pay and conditions). A retired officer was embarked to help find neutral and belligerents' trawlers, often known to the trawler skippers and on good terms, which helped when bartering for part of the trawlers' catch. Ratings were drawn from the RN, RFR, RNR, RNVR, "hostilities only" and former Merchant Navy ratings on special agreements.

The accommodations of AMCs were greatly superior to those on RN ships, even when fittings were removed to reduce the risk of fire. Lounges became wardrooms and junior ranks had a gunroom (junior officers' mess). Some cabins were used by chief and petty officers but most were demolished to make way for broadside messes to avoid delays when called to action stations. Holds and other spaces were filled with barrels or  oil drums as buoyancy ballast and called ping-pong balls. Even when laden with war stores the ships did not reach the peacetime GRT and carried heavy ballast of roadstone or iron to maintain stability. Horton was uneasy at the new arrivals whose crews were somewhat unready for hostilities and boarded each ship with his technical officers to help the process of familiarisation with Navy methods. Horton asked for more long-range reconnaissance aircraft. Three days after  had been torpedoed at Scapa Flow on 14 October 1939, the first seven AMCs arrived and by the end of November eleven AMCs were on patrol; Rawalpindi had already been sunk.

Armed merchant cruisers 1939–1941

Sinking of Rawalpindi

SS Rawalpindi was requisitioned for the Northern Patrol by the Admiralty on 26 August 1939 and converted into an armed merchant cruiser. Eight elderly 6 in (150 mm) guns and two 3 in (76 mm) guns were added and the ship named . On 19 October in the Denmark Strait, Rawalpindi intercepted the German tanker Gonzenheim (4,574 grt), which had left Buenos Aires on 14 September. The tanker was scuttled by her crew before a boarding party could get on board. The ships sent a wireless message but this was not received by the Germans.

On 26 September 1939, restrictions on the operation of the two German battleships Scharnhorst and Gneisenau in the Atlantic were terminated and after several short voyages, Grand Admiral Erich Raeder concluded that they were not vulnerable to the three Home Fleet battlecruisers in British home waters. The operation was intended to be a feint, to divert British ships from the hunt for Graf Spee in the South Atlantic. The battleships sailed on 21 November and on 13 November reached the Faroes–Iceland gap. At  Scharnhorst sighted a ship, opened fire from  then both ships began to rescue survivors.

Whilst patrolling north of the Faroes on 23 November 1939, Rawalpindi investigated a sighting, only to find that she had encountered the battleships Scharnhorst and Gneisenau; Rawalpindi managed to get off a sighting report to the Admiralty. Despite being hopelessly outgunned, 60-year-old Captain Edward Kennedy RN of Rawalpindi refused a German demand to surrender. He was heard to say "We’ll fight them both, they'll sink us, and that will be that. Good-bye". Rawalpindi sank in forty minutes but managed one hit on Scharnhorst, causing minor splinter damage. Thirty-seven men were rescued by the Germans and eleven men were picked up by the AMC HMS Chitral but 238 men were killed. At  the German ships were informed that Rawalpindi had got off a sighting report that the German ships were sailing south-east. As British ships could cut off their return, they sailed north-east into the Arctic Ocean and waited for a weather front before running the blockade on 26 November, safely returning to port.

September 1939 – January 1940

Western Patrol

The Admiralty had also floated a suggestion to Admiral Charles Forbes the commander-in-chief Home Fleet to move the Northern Patrol southwards to a line running north-west from the North Channel to watch for a German invasion of Ireland. Forbes threw cold water on the idea since an invasion force would sail west of the patrol line and that the AMCs would be vulnerable to U-boats which passed through the area en route to the Western Approaches. The Admiralty decided to mine the waters between Scotland and Iceland; the minefield was extended into the Denmark Strait to constrict the gap between the arctic ice off Greenland and the coast of Iceland with magnetic mines. Ships were directed to the Pentland Firth and between Orkney and the Faroes. The Germans took the change to mean that the AMCs were being replaced by aircraft and cruisers but the AMCs remained.

Raikes was replaced by Rear-Admiral Ernest Spooner on 16 July and for the rest of the month more patrols were sailed since the German invasion of Norway and four ships were sent for examination. The weather had at last improved and due to the war situation, shipping bound for the east coast ports had to take the route northabout Scotland. The admiralty decided on 21 July to extend the blockade to the French, Spanish and Portuguese Atlantic coasts and to French North Africa, naming it the Western Patrol. The ships were to be poached from the Northern Patrol but the new patrol was to remain under the existing command. Cilicia and Cheshire sailed on 19 July, to be joined by the trawlers Kingston Jacinth, Kingston Sapphire, Kingston Topaz and Kingston Turquoise. The number of ships on patrol in the area of the Northern Patrol had declined due to the detachments and because one AMC had been paid off and three transferred to the Atlantic and West Indies Command. Forbes ordered the Northern Patrol to watch the seas north of the Faroes. When Spooner asked for ten more trawlers or corvettes he was told that none was available.

On 9 August, Transylvania, having departed the Clyde and passed near Ailsa Craig, was torpedoed just after midnight and began to sink by the stern. A distress call got an aircraft on the scene by 03:15 then three destroyers; only Transylvania's ping-pong balls had stopped it from sinking faster. No casualties had been suffered in the torpedo explosion but one boat was launched with only five men on board and disappeared. The rest of the crew who should have boarded, crowded onto another boat which capsized and another overcrowded boat capsized next to a destroyer. The confusion of the evacuation in the dark and in bad weather caused the worst loss to the Northern Patrol since the sinking of Rawalpindi. On the following day, California received a distress signal from SS Llanfair and Captain Pope had to decide whether to obey standing orders to avoid a danger area or attempt a rescue. A British aircraft was overhead of Llanfair, the sea state made another attack by a U-boat difficult and Pope decided to risk it. California dropped depth-charges as it arrived and picked up swiftly the thirty survivors, receiving orders not to attempt a rescue thirty minutes afterwards.

Interceptions January–April 1940

End of the Northern Patrol

On 18 November 1940, after the sinking of Laurentic and Patroclus the Admiralty decided to abolish the Northern Patrol except for the patrol of the Denmark Strait, the Faroes–Iceland gap to be left to trawlers and the minefields. Surplus ships were to be diverted to the Western Patrol. The average number of ships on the Northern Patrol was cut to five out of the eleven ships left, with three on the Western Patrol. The Northern Patrol checked fifteen ships and the Western Patrol 155, three from the latter being sent under guard for inspection. Klaus Schoke (5,800 GRT) of the Hansa Line departed on 1 December for Ponta Delgada in the Azores for Vigo in Spain but was stopped by the AMC California. The crew tried to scuttle the ship and despite an attempt to save the ship it sank on 5 December. On the Northern Patrol, Forfar had refitted at Liverpool, sailed on 30 November escorted by a destroyer, which was ordered back near midnight on 1 December.

Forfar was ordered to divert south around a U-boat said to be in the area of 54° 23' N and 20° 11' west. Course was changed and before joining the Western Patrol, was diverted to escort the eastbound Convoy SC 14. Forfar sailed near Convoy HX 90 by coincidence, which was being shadowed by four U-boats; at 03:30 the lookouts spotted something but the captain of Forfar decided to maintain the zig-zag and at 04:40 Forfar was struck by a torpedo. Within the hour, four more torpedoes hit the ship; many of the lifeboats were caught in the explosions making an organised evacuation impossible, many men going into water slicked with oil. Members of the crew had been killed in the torpedo explosions, others died of wounds and another 178 killed after abandoning ship; it was the worst disaster to the Northern Patrol since the sinking of Rawalpindi.

See also
 Dover Patrol
 North Sea Mine Barrage
 Action of 4 April 1941

Notes

References

Bibliography
Books

 
 
 
 
 
 
 
 
 
  
 
 
 

Websites

Further reading
Books
 
 
 
 
 
 
 
 
 
 
 
 
 

Theses

External links
 Armed Merchant Cruiser
 List of Second World War AMCs
 Excerpt from the First World War Encyclopedia

Royal Navy patrols
North Sea operations of World War I
Military units and formations of the Royal Navy in World War I
Military units and formations of the Royal Navy in World War II